The men's 5000 metres race of the 2013 World Single Distance Speed Skating Championships was held on 22 March at 17:00 local time.

Results

References

Men 05000